The Budabukkala is a community that has been designated an Other Backward Class in Andhra Pradesh since 1993. They were traditionally known as wandering minstrels who sand folk songs and wore colorful costumes.

See also
Telugu castes

References

Other Backward Classes